The 2015 season was the 101st in Sociedade Esportiva Palmeiras existence. This season Palmeiras participated in the Campeonato Paulista, Copa do Brasil and the Série A.

Players

Squad information 
.

 (captain)

Transfers

Transfers in

Transfers out

Competitions

Overview

Friendlies

Campeonato Paulista

Standings

First stage 
In the first stage, the teams play in a group with all of the clubs of other groups in a single round, qualifying for the quarterfinal the 2 teams with the most points won this stage in each of the groups. Schedule was released on December 1, 2014.

Quarterfinal

Semifinal

Final

Copa do Brasil

First round 

The draw for the first round was held on December 16, 2014.

Second round

Third round

Round of 16 

A draw by CBF was held on August 4 to set the matches of the round of 16.

Quarterfinal 
For this round another draw was held on August 31.

Semifinal 
The order of the matches was determined by a draw which as held on October 5.

Final 
The order of the matches was determined by a draw.

Campeonato Brasileiro

Standings

Matches 
Schedule released on March 3, 2015. And detailed the first ten rounds on March 17, 2015.

Statistics

Overall statistics

Goalscorers 
In italic players who left the team in mid-season.

Disciplinary record 
In italic players who left the team in mid-season.

References

External links 
 Official site 

2015
Palmeiras